This page shows the membership statistics of the Church of Jesus Christ of Latter-day Saints (LDS Church) within the United States.
 Official LDS Membership - Membership count on record provided by the LDS Church. These records include adults and children, and also include both active and less active members.
 From religious surveys - General religious surveys conducted within the United States. These surveyed U.S. adults about their religious beliefs.

Membership defined 
Membership reported by the Church of Jesus Christ of Latter-day Saints on December 31, 2021 was used to determine the number of members in each state. The church defines membership as:
 "Those who have been baptized and confirmed."
 "Those under age nine who have been blessed but not baptized."
 "Those who are not accountable because of intellectual disabilities, regardless of age."
 "Unblessed children under 8 when both of the following apply:
 "At least one parent or one grandparent is a member of the Church."
 "Both parents give permission for a record to be created. (If only one parent has legal custody of the child, the permission of that parent is sufficient.)"

The United States Census Bureau 2021 population estimates was used as the basis for the general population. Each state link gives a brief history and additional membership information for that state.

Table

Congregational

Members and growth

Territories

From religious surveys

2001 American Religious Identification Survey 

The 2001 American Religious Identification Survey (ARIS) was based on a random digit-dialed telephone survey of 50,281 American adults in the continental U.S.

2007 Pew Forum on Religion & Public Life 

The Pew Forum on Religion & Public Life published a survey of 35,556 adults living in the United States that was conducted in 2007. The 2007 survey, conducted by Princeton Survey Research Associates International (PSRAI), found 1.7% of the U.S. adult population self identified themselves as Mormon. The table below lists a few significant findings, from the survey, about Mormons. Note: some less populated states were combined in this survey. These include:Montana-Wyoming,D.C.-Maryland, North & South Dakota, New Hampshire-Vermont, and Connecticut-Rhode Island. The racial and ethnic composition of the U.S. membership is predominantly white with a lower percentage of blacks when compared to the U.S. average.

See also 

Membership history of the Church of Jesus Christ of Latter-day Saints
Membership history of the Church of Jesus Christ of Latter-day Saints (Canada)

References 

The Church of Jesus Christ of Latter-day Saints
Membership statistics
Religious demographics